Alice High School is a senior high school in Alice, Texas. A part of the Alice Independent School District, it serves Alice and surrounding communities in Jim Wells County.

Attendance area 
Areas within Alice ISD, of which Alice High is its only comprehensive high school, include Alice, Alice Acres, Amargosa, Coyote Acres, Owl Ranch, Rancho Alegre, and portions of Loma Linda East and Ben Bolt.

History 
The City of Alice originated from the defunct community of Collins, which was located three miles east.  Around 1880 the San Antonio and Aransas Pass Railway attempted to build a line through Collins.  The townspeople did not want to sell their land to the railroad company; consequently, the railroad site was moved three miles west, and in 1883 a depot called Bandana was established at its junction with the Corpus Christi, San Diego and Rio Grande Railway.  Bandana soon became a thriving cattle-shipping point, and application for a post office was made under the name Kleberg in honor of Robert Justus Kleberg.  The petition was denied because a town named Kleberg already appeared on the post office list, so residents then chose the name Alice, in honor of Alice Gertrudis King Kleberg, Kleberg's wife and the daughter of Richard King.  The Alice post office opened for business in 1888, and within a few years the remaining residents of Collins moved to Alice.

The first school began in 1887 in the attic of the old Sedwick House.  In 1930, the Alice School Board contracted to build a school containing thirteen classrooms and a library. Classes in this facility first commenced in January 1931 as the new Alice High School located along 3rd Street. When Mr. William Adams celebrated his 88th birthday on January 3, 1933, a public announcement, based on unanimous vote of the school board paid homage to Mr. Adams for his many contributions to the city by renaming the school after him.  The School Board voted to change the name of the High School back to Alice High in 1969.  Construction of Alice High was completed in time for 1970 school year, and the first graduating class was in 1971.

Academics 
Alice High School is part of the Alice Independent School District, which Met Standards under TEA Assessment and Accountability Division of Performance Reporting ratings as of 2014.

Alice High School itself Met Standards under the TEA rating system, and earned distinctions in Reading/ELA and Math as of 2014.
 Alice High School Website

School Songs and Traditions 
Alma Mater
 Hail! Alice High. The school we love so dear. Where friends we've met. We'll not forget. Throughout the coming years. So here's to the Orange and the White. The colors for which we fight. Let's pledge anew and all be true to Dear Old Alice High.
Fight Song
 On ye Coyotes, On ye Coyotes Forward against the foe. We will win thru thick or thin. Forever as we go, go, go, go. Orange and White forever fight. We're Coyotes 'til the end. Fight Coyotes fight, fight, fight. And win, win, win. GO!!! FIGHT!!! WIN!!!
Jalisco "The Pride of South Texas"
 Traditionally played during football games
The Pride of South Texas by Buddy Travis (1986) Logo 
Traditional logo    logo  

Fan Support
 Alice has a great tradition of filling up the stands at high school sporting events.  Especially during the post-season, do not be surprised to see a line of cars behind the school buses transporting the team.

After Football Games
 After every football game, the team, cheerleaders, trainers, and fans stand in front of the band, interlock pinkies, and sway side to side to the sound of the school Alma Mater.

"The Original Pride of South Texas"
 For over 100 years, Alice athletics and academics have consistently represented South Texas well in local and state competitions.  The school has earned its nickname as "The Pride of South Texas" because of this consistency.
Operation Graduation
 Each school year ends with a lock-in at the High School for graduating seniors.

 Athletics 
Alice High School has athletes that compete in 13 different sports, which include:

Cross Country, Volleyball, Football, Basketball, Swimming, Soccer, Golf, Tennis, Track, Softball, Baseball, Power-lifting, and Cheerleading.

The home football games, soccer games, and track meets are held at Memorial Stadium, which has a capacity of 10,500.

The 2014-2015 season has the Coyotes playing in conference 30-5A along with Calallen High School, Flour Bluff High School, Victoria East High School, Victoria West High School, Foy H. Moody High School, Tuloso-Midway High School, Roy Miller High School, and Gregory-Portland High School.
 Alice Coyotes Fan Website

 Football 

High school football has been part of Alice, Texas since 1905.  The school's first official game was a 38-0 win over H.M. King High School (Kingsville, TX) in the year 1909.  Since 1909 the Alice Coyotes have won 21 district titles, made 36 playoff appearances (18th all-time and 6th most in Class 4a history), and played in 4 Texas State semi-final games (1955(William Adams), 1979, 1998, and 1999). The Alice Coyote Football Team’s all-time record is 541-371-34.

Alice High School's rival is Henrietta M. King High School (Kingsville, TX).  The first meeting between the teams was in 1909, and matchup is known as "The Brush County Shootout."  The Alice Football team and their fans rode 20 miles in horse drawn buggies to Kingsville. Alice won the game 38-0. Since then, the two teams have played each other 81 times. Alice leads the series 43-35-3 as of 2010.
 Youtube Video: Boys of Fall - featuring the Alice Coyote football team

 Student activities 

 Clubs 
Current clubs at Alice High School include Art, Auto Mechanics, BPA, Band Council, Building Trades, Cheerleaders, Chorale, Cosmetology, DECA, Decathlon, Drama, Drill Team/Strutters, Environmental Club, FCCLA, FFA, Graphics, HOSA, Interact/Rotary, JETS, Junior Class, Law Enforcement, Newspaper, NHS, ROTC, Senior Class, Spanish, Student Council, TAFE, UIL, and Yearbook.

 Alice High School Band 
The Alice High School band was organized in 1933. In 1960, Bryce Taylor was hired on as Band Director in Alice. He spent the next fifty years as music supervisor and high school band director for the Alice ISD. In his tenure, the Alice High School band earned 29 consecutive UIL Sweepstakes awards and placed in the top five TMEA Honor Band auditions for Class 5A twelve times. The Alice High School band was one of the first five schools to be awarded the Sudler Flag of Honor by John Philip Sousa Foundation and is listed on their national Roll of Honor for high school bands in existence between 1960 and 1980. The band is now under the direction of Arnold Garza who himself was a student of Bryce Taylor.
 Alice High School Band Website

 Theatre Department 
Alice High School has an award-winning theatre department with a strong reputation in the educational theatre community. For the first two decades, the drama program was under the direction of Don Howell. Well respected around the state for his theatre expertise, he was able to take the UIL One Act Play team to state competition on several occasions. After retirement Mr. Howell went on to work for the U.I.L. One Act Play office located at the University of Texas and to adjudicate for UIL. Following his retirement in 1993, Darleen Totten took over and has continued to promote outstanding theatre at Alice High School. Under her direction the students received the National Forensic League Leading Chapter award and performed at Thespian State and the International Thespian Festival on numerous occasions.  In the fall of 2006, the Alice High School Theatre Department received international attention when their thespian troop appeared in Dramatics Magazine and Ms. Totten was interviewed for a story in Stage Directions MagazineIn 2007 and 2016, the thespian troupe 5191 was chosen to perform The Effect of Gamma Rays on Man-in-the-moon Marigolds at Lincoln, Nebraska, for the International Thespian Festival. The students were given a standing ovation by thousands of drama students from around the world. They were also invited to bring Crimes of the Heart for the Chapter select performance the following year. The play was directed by a student, Sylvia Gonzalez.  They did not perform because one of the cast members had emergency surgery just before the trip to Nebraska. Darleen Totten also led Alice High School Drama club on an outstanding UIL OAP journey in 2011, with their production of Turandot which was also presented at the International Thespian Festival in Lincoln, Nebraska. This performance has been featured on the EdTA website. Clips of the school's production of Turandot'' are used in promotional videos for Thespians created by EdTA.  In January 2014, they were invited to perform She Kills Monsters at the Alabama State Thespian Festival. Pictures of their trip to Alabama were shared by the Samuel French publishing company.

Notable alumni 
James P. Allison - Cancer researcher at the University of Texas who won the 2018 Nobel Prize in Physiology or Medicine
 Tommy Aycock - A longtime PGA professional golfer.  He was inducted into the Texas Golf Hall of Fame in 1996.
 Manuel Barrera -  Jr. College All American won national jc championship at Henderson. All American at Kansas State, co-captain and played in Blue-Gray all star game. He was drafted 6th round by the Pittsburgh Steelers in 1970. Injuries forced him to retire. He later became a very successful high school coach.
 Marv Brown - He was drafted in the 25th round (301st overall) by the Detroit Lions in 1953.  He was part of the Detroit team that won the championship in 1957.
 Sonny Brown - Ex NFL Player (Houston Oilers) and Member of the 1985 National Champions Oklahoma Sooners (Brown was named MVP of the championship game).
 Chris Brazzell - CFL and ex NFL player with the Dallas Cowboys.
 Lois Chiles - American actress and former fashion model known for her roles as Dr. Holly Goodhead in the 1979 James Bond film Moonraker, and as a hit and run driver in 1987's Creepshow 2.
 Bobby Cuellar - bullpen coach of the Minnesota Twins of Major League Baseball. He is a former professional baseball player who played briefly with the Texas Rangers in 1977 as a relief pitcher.
 J. Frank Dobie - Was a professor at Cambridge University and the University of Texas.  He is also an award-winning author and political activist.  He is credited with helping to save the Longhorn Cattle from extinction.  The Dobie Center in Austin is named after him.
 Joe Pate - He was a left-handed pitcher with the Philadelphia Athletics in 1926 and 1927.
 Jim Tyrone - Professional baseball player for the Chicago Cubs and Oakland Athletics during the 70s.
 Wayne Tyrone - Professional baseball player for the Chicago Cubs in 1976.
 Walter F. Woodul - Lieutenant Governor of Texas from 1935-1939.

Miscellaneous

The Year 1933 
 Cost of education in Alice amounted to .27 cents per student per day.
 160 students enrolled in Senior High.
 119 students enrolled in Junior High.

Memorial Stadium 
 Construction of Memorial Stadium was completed in 1947.
 The first game played at the stadium was on October 17, 1947 (Alice beat Taft High School 6-0).
 This grand old stadium has seen and been a part of many historic games in South Texas football lore. Home of The Pride of South Texas, The Alice Coyotes. The grounds crew at Alice takes pride in having one of the best playing surfaces in South Texas, as voted on by many area coaches, and turf builders around the State of Texas.
 Alice Memorial Stadium was nicknamed, The Skydome back in 1980 by then Coach Bob Boyd. Alice was going to play Stafford Dulles in the bi-district round of the playoffs. Dulles wanted The Astrodome, we wanted Alice, well we won the flip. Coach Boyd called the coaches and kids back at Alice and said, We're playing in the dome, everyone started jumping around because they thought he meant the Astrodome, he then said, 'The Skydome they are coming to Alice. Alice won that game 14-10.
 Memorial Stadium has a capacity of 10,500.

The Year 1950 
 Alice hosts the first annual "Hub City Relays."  The track meet still takes place today.

References

External links 
 Alice High School Website
 Alice Coyote Fan Website
 Alice High School Band Website
 Alice High School - Youtube Video 

Public high schools in Texas
Alice, Texas
Schools in Jim Wells County, Texas